Fiorino may refer to:
 The fiorino d'oro or florin, gold currency of the Republic of Florence
 Fiat Fiorino, a van manufactured by Fiat Motors
 Tuscan fiorino, the currency of Tuscany between 1826 and 1859
 Fiorino, Montescudaio, an Italian village in the province of Pisa, Tuscany
 Fiorino Bianco, politician in Montreal, Quebec, Canada
 infernoFio, Minecraft Survivor player

See also
 Fiorina (disambiguation)
 Fiorini (disambiguation)

Italian masculine given names